Hyaleucerea mundula is a moth of the subfamily Arctiinae. It was described by Carlos Berg in 1882 and is found in Brazil.

References

Moths described in 1882
Euchromiina